Prunum batabanoense is a species of sea snail, a marine gastropod mollusk in the family Marginellidae, the margin snails.

Description
The shell grows to a length of 14 mm

Distribution
This species occurs in the Caribbean Sea, south of Cuba.

References

 Espinosa J. & Ortea J. (2002) Nuevas especies de margineliformes de Cuba, Bahamas y el Mar Caribe de Costa Rica. Avicennia 15: 101–128. page(s): 116

Marginellidae
Gastropods described in 2002